Imam Bagus Kurnia (born 22 July 1995) is an Indonesian professional footballer who plays as a winger for Liga 2 club Gresik United.

Club career

Madura United
In 2018, Imam Bagus signed a contract with Indonesian Liga 1 club Madura United. He made his league debut on 19 May 2018 in a match against Persipura Jayapura at the Mandala Stadium, Jayapura.

PSCS Cilacap
In 2019 Imam Bagus signed with PSCS Cilacap for the 2019 Liga 2. He made 13 league appearances and scored 4 goals for PSCS Cilacap.

Sriwijaya
He was signed for Sriwijaya to play in Liga 2 in the 2020 season. This season was suspended on 27 March 2020 due to the COVID-19 pandemic. The season was abandoned and was declared void on 20 January 2021.

Gresik United
Imam Bagus was signed for Gresik United to play in Liga 2 in the 2022–23 season.

Career statistics

Club

Honours

Club
PS TNI U-21
 Indonesia Soccer Championship U-21: 2016

Individual
 Liga Nusantara Top Goalscorer: 2014 (4 goals)

References

External links
 
 Imam Bagus Kurnia at Liga Indonesia

1995 births
Living people
Indonesian Muslims
Liga 1 (Indonesia) players
Liga 2 (Indonesia) players
PSMS Medan players
PSS Sleman players
Madura United F.C. players
PSCS Cilacap players
Sriwijaya F.C. players
Gresik United players
Association football forwards
Association football wingers
Indonesian footballers
People from Madura Island
Sportspeople from East Java